Loughborough Lightning are a women's rugby union club based in Loughborough, Leicestershire, England. They are the women's team of Loughborough Students RUFC and Loughborough University. Together with the netball team and the women's cricket team, the rugby union team is one of three women's sports teams based Loughborough University that use the Loughborough Lightning name.   In 2017, they were selected as a franchise for the inaugural Premier 15s season.

History 
LSWRFC were initially founded in the late 1970s during a boom in women playing rugby at universities across England. In 1983, Loughborough Students were one of the founder members of the Women's Rugby Football Union, set up to regulate women's rugby throughout the British Isles.  Two years later, they hosted the American touring Wiverns rugby team and provided a number of players to the Midlands Select XV that played against the Wiverns on their tour. In 2009, Loughborough worked with the Nottingham Rugby Union in order to promote more men coming to Loughborough matches. When the British Universities and Colleges Sport rugby union leagues were formed in 2004, Loughborough won the league for the first three consecutive years.

In 2016, Loughborough Lightning bid for a franchise in the new competition originally known as Women's Super Rugby and now as the Premier 15s, which was replacing the Women's Premiership. A year later it announced that Loughborough Lightning were successful in their bid for a place in the top flight of English women's rugby. This made them the only student team that was awarded a franchise to play in the league. This was controversial as Loughborough Lightning had not previously played in the RFUW leagues and Lichfield Ladies who had been in the Women's Premiership for 15 years were excluded.

External links
  www.lboro.ac.uk
 Loughborough Lightning on Facebook
  Loughborough Lightning on Twitter

References

Women's rugby union teams in England
Rugby